The Duck River is a short, partly tidal stream in Old Lyme, Connecticut.  It joins the Connecticut River in the estuary at Watch Rock Park, just above the point where the Connecticut flows into Long Island Sound.

The river bisects the Old Lyme Cemetery.

The Duck River is popular among artists and photographers.

See also
List of rivers of Connecticut

References

Old Lyme, Connecticut
Rivers of New London County, Connecticut
Tributaries of the Connecticut River
Rivers of Connecticut